Feeler is the third studio album by British-based American musician Marcella Detroit. It was first released in September 1996 by AAA Records in the UK, ironically, the lead single "I Hate You Now..." was released in the same month as "I Can Drive", the lead single from Detroit's former band Shakespears Sister's third album #3.

Critical reception 

Aaron Badgley from Allmusic lauded the album, calling it "honest", and "infinitely better than her debut" (Incorrectly referring to Jewel). In contrast, Andy Gill from The Independent gave the album a negative review, saying "Detroit's problem is one of over-abundant choice – she's a good guitarist, a good pianist, a good vocalist, a good harmonica player, and probably pretty nifty on bass and drums, too, but she needs more discipline as to their application."

Track listing

Singles 
"I Hate You Now..." was released as Feeler's lead single in June 1996, and peaked at #96 on the UK Singles Chart. This was followed by "Somebody's Mother", which failed to chart, and "Boy" which reached #83. The fourth and final single, "Flower", was released in mid-1997 and failed to chart.

Charts

References 

1996 albums
Marcella Detroit albums